Liza del Rosario is a Filipino ten-pin bowling player.  She won the Trios Gold medal at the 2003 World Championships in Kuala Lumpur. It was the first gold medal for the Philippines in the world championships in 20 years. She won the Singles and All Events gold medals at the 17th Asian Championships in Hong Kong in 2002.   

Del Rosario attended De La Salle University and was awarded DLSAA Lasallian Sports Achievement award in 2006 and 2008.

World Events
She won the Trios Gold medal at the 2003 World Championships in Kuala Lumpur with Liza Clutario and Cecilia Yap. She placed third in Singles at the World Games in 2009 held in Kaohsiung

Southeast Asian Games
She won the doubles Gold medal with Arianne Cerdeña at the 21st SEA Games in Penang, Malaysia in 2001. She won the silver medal Mixed doubles with Biboy Rivera at 24th SEA Games held in Bangkok, Thailand in 2007 when the event was first introduced in the games.

References

Living people
Year of birth missing (living people)
Filipino ten-pin bowling players
Competitors at the 2009 World Games
World Games medalists in bowling
World Games bronze medalists
Asian Games medalists in bowling
Bowlers at the 2002 Asian Games
Bowlers at the 2006 Asian Games
Bowlers at the 2010 Asian Games
Bowlers at the 2014 Asian Games
Bowlers at the 2018 Asian Games
Asian Games silver medalists for the Philippines
Medalists at the 2002 Asian Games
Southeast Asian Games medalists in bowling
Southeast Asian Games gold medalists for the Philippines
Southeast Asian Games competitors for the Philippines
Southeast Asian Games silver medalists for the Philippines
Southeast Asian Games bronze medalists for the Philippines